Hasan Erbey (born 21 September 1991, in İzmir, Turkey) is a Turkish footballer. He currently plays as a center fullback for Amed SK.

Erbey began his professional football career in 2005 with Karşıyaka S.K. in İzmir, and later joined Fenerbahçe in 2006. He wears the number 35 shirt, after İzmir's traffic code.

On 23 August 2012, he joined Giresunspor on loan for their 2012-13 campaign.

Honours
Individual:

 Fenerbahçe
 Süper Lig: 2010–11

References

External links

fenerbahce.org profile 

1991 births
Living people
Footballers from İzmir
Turkish footballers
Turkey youth international footballers
TFF First League players
TFF Second League players
1922 Konyaspor footballers
Giresunspor footballers
Altay S.K. footballers
TKİ Tavşanlı Linyitspor footballers
Aydınspor footballers
Tokatspor footballers
Tepecikspor footballers
Association football defenders